Dalton Harris (born 29 December 1993) is a Jamaican singer. In 2010, he won Digicel Rising Star, and subsequently signed with VP Records. In 2018, he won the final season of The X Factor in the United Kingdom.

Early and personal life
Harris was born in Clarendon, Jamaica, before moving to Kingston to pursue his music career. Harris recalled living a difficult life growing up in Jamaica with a large family with 22 siblings, being poor, and living on his own since the age of 15. He also talked about being physically and mentally abused in his early life. Harris attended Kingston College, where he passed six CSEC subjects. In October 2020, Harris stated that he is pansexual.

Career
In 2010, Harris became the youngest winner of the Jamaican singing competition Digicel Rising Stars where he won a cash prize of $1.5 million JMD. After his win, he began releasing music in Jamaica. He then traveled across the States for five years to widen his scope. He released many tracks like "I'm Numb", "Watch Over Me" and "That Wonderful Sound" in 2015, "All I Need", "Whisper in the Wind", "Unfaithful Chronicles" and "Dem Kinda Woman" in 2016 and "Perilous Time" in 2017. In 2018, he released the joint album Unintentional Astronaut with Mike Needler.

In 2018, Harris entered season 15 of The X Factor in the United Kingdom. He auditioned for the series with "Sorry Seems to Be the Hardest Word" by Elton John. He received four yeses from the four judges Robbie Williams, Ayda Field, Louis Tomlinson and Simon Cowell. Competing in the category of "Boys", he was coached by Tomlinson. Owing the success and increasing popularity of the Jamaican act, the British X Factor was broadcast in Jamaica after the local Television Jamaica (TVJ) bought the rights of broadcasting the programme live in Jamaica. On the six-chair challenge, Harris was the last contestant to perform, singing "Purple Rain" by Prince. He performed "I'm Feeling Good" in the semi-final and "Clown" from Emeli Sandé. Harris was consistently the favorite to win the show. He reached the final of the contest on 1 December 2018 alongside Anthony Russell and Scarlett Lee. In the final, he sang "A Song for You" from Leon Russell, and dueted "Beneath Your Beautiful" with Emeli Sande. His winner's single was "The Power of Love", performed as a duet with James Arthur, who won the ninth series of The X Factor in 2012.

On 15 December 2019, Harris released the song "Cry", and on its day of release, he performed the song on the Live Final of The X Factor: The Band.

Discography

Singles

Awards and nominations

References

External links

Living people
1993 births
Jamaican male singers
Jamaican pop singers
Jamaican reggae singers
Jamaican LGBT singers
Pansexual men
People from Clarendon Parish, Jamaica
The X Factor winners
The X Factor (British TV series) winners
Jamaican expatriates in the United Kingdom
Jamaican emigrants to the United Kingdom
Pansexual musicians
21st-century LGBT people